Hervé Moulin  (born 1950 in Paris) is a French mathematician who is the Donald J. Robertson Chair of Economics at the Adam Smith Business School at the University of Glasgow. He is known for his research contributions in mathematical economics, in particular in the fields of mechanism design, social choice, game theory and fair division.  He has written five books and over 100 peer-reviewed articles.

Moulin was the George A. Peterkin Professor of Economics at Rice University (from 1999 to 2013):, the James B. Duke Professor of Economics at Duke University (from 
1989 to 1999) and the University Distinguished Professor at Virginia Tech (from 
1987 to 1989). He is a fellow of the Econometric Society since 1983, and the president of the Game Theory Society for the term 2016 - 2018. He also served as president of the Society for Social Choice and Welfare for the period of 1998 to 1999. He became a Fellow of the Royal Society of Edinburgh in 2015.

Moulin's research has been supported in part by seven grants from the US National Science Foundation. He collaborates as an adviser with the fair division website Spliddit, created by Ariel Procaccia. On the occasion of his 65th birthday, the Paris School of Economics and the Aix-Marseille University organised a conference in his honor, with Peyton Young, William Thomson, Salvador Barbera, and Moulin himself among the speakers.

Biography

Moulin obtained his undergraduate degree from the École Normale Supérieure in Paris in 1971 and his doctoral degree in Mathematics at the University of Paris-IX in 1975 with a thesis on zero-sum games, which was published in French at the Mémoires de la Société Mathématique de France and in English in the Journal of Mathematical Analysis and its Applications.

On 1979, he published a seminal paper in Econometrica introducing the notion of dominance solvable games. Dominance solvability is a solution concept for games which is based on an iterated procedure of deletion of dominated strategies by all participants. Dominance solvability is a stronger concept than Nash equilibrium because it does not require ex-ante coordination. Its only requirement is iterated common knowledge of rationality. His work on this concept was mentioned in Eric Maskin's Nobel Prize Lecture.

One year later he proved an interesting result concerning the famous Gibbard-Satterthwaite Theorem, which states that any voting procedure on the universal domain of preferences whose range contains more than two alternatives is either dictatorial or manipulable. Moulin proved that it is possible to define non-dictatorial and non-manipulable social choice functions in the restricted domain of single-peaked preferences, i.e. those in which there is a unique best option, and other options are better as they are closer to the favorite one. Moreover, he provided a characterization of such rules. This paper inspired a whole literature on achieving strategy-proofness and fairness (even in a weak form as non-dictatorial schemes) on restricted domains of preferences.

Moulin is also known for his seminal work in cost sharing and assignment problems. In particular, jointly with Anna Bogomolnaia, he proposed the probabilistic-serial procedure as a solution to the fair random assignment problem, which consists of dividing several goods among a number of persons. Probabilistic serial allows each person to "eat" her favorite shares, hence defining a probabilistic outcome. It always produces an outcome which is unambiguously efficient ex-ante, and thus has a strong claim over the popular random priority. The paper was published in 2001 in the Journal of Economic Theory. By summer of 2016, the article had 395 citations.

He has been credited as the first proposer of the famous beauty contest game, also known as the guessing game, which shows that players fail to anticipate strategic behavior from other players. Experiments testing the equilibrium prediction of this game started the field of experimental economics.

In July 2018 Moulin was elected Fellow of the British Academy (FBA).

Coauthors

Moulin has published work jointly with Matthew O. Jackson, Scott Shenker, and Anna Bogomolnaia, among many other academics.

See also
 List of economists

References

External links
 Hervé Moulin's Personal Website
 List of Hervé Moulin's Publications at IDEAS REPEC
 

1950 births
Living people
Game theorists
French economists
Fellows of the Econometric Society
French mathematicians
University of Paris alumni
French expatriates in Scotland
Fellows of the British Academy
Fair division researchers